SUPP or Supp may refer to:
Sarawak United Peoples' Party, a Malaysian political party
Support (measure theory), a mathematical concept
Eckhard Supp, German photographer and writer